Wabash Avenue–East Historic District is a national historic district located at Terre Haute, Vigo County, Indiana. It encompasses 20 contributing buildings in the central business district of Terre Haute.  It developed between about 1880 and 1940 and includes representative examples of Italianate, Romanesque Revival, Renaissance Revival, and Art Deco style architecture.  Located in the district is the separately listed Indiana Theatre.  Other notable buildings include The Kaufman Block (1863-1868), Terre Haute Trust Company (1908), the Tribune Building (1912), Bement-Rea Warehouse (1908), Swope Block (1901), AT&T Building (c. 1940), and Ohio Building (1912).

It was listed on the National Register of Historic Places in 1983, with boundary adjustments in 1992 (5 properties removed, one new property added) and in 2006 (3 properties removed, 13 new properties added).

References

Historic districts on the National Register of Historic Places in Indiana
Italianate architecture in Indiana
Romanesque Revival architecture in Indiana
Renaissance Revival architecture in Indiana
Art Deco architecture in Indiana
Historic districts in Terre Haute, Indiana
National Register of Historic Places in Terre Haute, Indiana